Slavsko Polje is a village in central Croatia, in the municipality of Gvozd, Sisak-Moslavina County. It is connected by the D6 highway.

History
In the late 17th century, the village became a part of the Military Frontier. In the 18th century, it belonged to the Glina regiment. The development of the Vrginmost-Karlovac railway line in 1905 was important for the development of the village as it both provided employment (i.e. railway maintenance work) and allowed residents to seek employment and engage in trade further afield. In 1918, the village became a part of the Serbian-Croatian-Slovenian Kingdom and later on, the Kingdom of Yugoslavia.

The village suffered heavy demographic losses in the World War II with 417 of its residents perishing. Of those, 235 were civilian victims of fascism while 81 died as partisan resistance fighters, and others succumbed to typhoid. In Glina massacres alone, 136 men and boys lost their lives in early August 1941. The first residents losing their lives already in May 1941 perished in the Jadovno concentration camp while some of its captured partisans died as prisoners of war in far away Norway. After being heavily hit by brutal Ustaše campaign in summer 1941, the population joined the antifascist resistance movement en masse.

Demographics
According to the 2011 census, the village of Slavsko Polje has 338 inhabitants. This represents 44.95% of its pre-war population according to the 1991 census.

Population by ethnicity

Sports 
 Zavičaj Slavsko Polje, soccer club

Sights 
 Monument to the uprising of the people of Kordun and Banija

Notable natives and residents 
 Branko Mamula (1921-2021) - antifascist, resistance fighter, admiral of the JNA and Minister of Defence of Yugoslavia in period 1982—1988
Simo Vučinić (1915-1943) - antifascist, partisan and People's Hero of Yugoslavia

See also 
 Glina massacres

References 

Populated places in Sisak-Moslavina County
Serb communities in Croatia